Barthélemy Louis Joseph Schérer (December 18, 1747 – August 19, 1804), born in Delle, near Belfort, became a French general during the French Revolutionary Wars and on three occasions led armies in battle.

Early career
Schérer served in the Austrian army long before the Revolution, but defected to France in 1775. In 1780 Schérer became a major in an artillery regiment stationed in Strasbourg. He entered Dutch service in 1785 as a major in the Légion de Maillebois. In 1790 he was released from Dutch service with the rank of lieutenant colonel.

French Revolution
He returned to France in 1791 and in 1792 was made a captain in the 82nd Infantry Regiment, serving as aide-de-camp to General Jean de Prez de Crassier at the Battle of Valmy. In 1793 he served as a senior aide-de-camp to general Alexandre de Beauharnais on the Rhine. In 1794, Schérer was promoted to the rank of général de division and commanded a division in the Army of the Sambre and Meuse, serving with distinction at the Battle of Aldenhoven. On May 3 he married Marie Françoise Henriette Caroline Müller in a civil ceremony at Delle in the Franche-Comté. On November 3, 1794, he was named commander of the Army of Italy before his transfer to command the Army of the Eastern Pyrenees on March 3, 1795. On June 14 a 35,000-strong Spanish army defeated Schérer's 25,000 men in battle at Bàscara in Catalonia province in Spain.

On August 31, 1795, he was again sent to Italy to replace François Kellerman (the older) as commander-in-chief of the Army of Italy. As commander of the Army of Italy, Schérer won the Battle of Loano (November 22–24, 1795) against an Austrian army but failed to exploit his advantage due to his own caution and winter weather. He was relieved of the command of this army on February 23, 1796, and replaced by Napoleon Bonaparte. Schérer was then unemployed for a number of months until being named Inspector-General of Cavalry, first of the Army of the Interior and then of the Army of the Rhine and the Moselle.

War of the Second Coalition
Schérer served as French Minister of War from July 22, 1797, to February 21, 1799. When the War of the Second Coalition broke out, Schérer was given command of the Army of Italy once again. He won an initial clash at Pastrengo on March 26. But he proved unable to stop the Russo-Austrian advance. He was defeated by Austrian General Pál Kray at the Battle of Magnano on April 5. "Schérer went into this battle without forming a reserve and was thus unable to react to crisis or opportunities effectively." Forced to retire behind the river Mincio, he gave up command to Jean Moreau. Because of his loss of Italy he was forced to appear before a committee of inquiry. After securing an acquittal, he retired to private life on his estate at Chauny in Picardy, where he died in 1804.

References
 Chandler, David. The Campaigns of Napoleon. New York: Macmillan, 1966.
 Smith, Digby. The Napoleonic Wars Data Book. London: Greenhill, 1998.

Footnotes

External links
website of the city of Delle about Schérer
 Barthélemy Louis Joseph Schérer (1747-1804) The Encyclopedia of the French Revolutionary and Napoleonic Wars

1747 births
1804 deaths
People from the Territoire de Belfort
French generals
Military leaders of the French Revolutionary Wars
French Republican military leaders of the French Revolutionary Wars
French Ministers of War
18th-century French politicians
Names inscribed under the Arc de Triomphe